Elm City is a town in Wilson County, North Carolina, United States. The population was 1,298 in 2010.

History
The Elm City Municipal Historic District, W. H. Langley House, and Webb-Barron-Wells House were listed on the National Register of Historic Places in 1986.

In the summer of 1964, the Ku Klux Klan drove away a group of black and white teenage volunteers repainting the local First Presbyterian Church. Subsequently, adult volunteers returned to finish the job, and Governor Terry Sanford dispatched state troopers to protect the team of integrated volunteers. An attempt was later made by two white youths from Rocky Mount to burn down the church but they failed.

Geography
Elm City is located at  (35.807729, -77.862161).

Demographics

2020 census

As of the 2020 United States census, there were 1,218 people, 547 households, and 368 families residing in the town.

2000 census
As of the census of 2000, there were 1,165 people, 474 households, and 328 families residing in the town. The population density was 1,555.6 people per square mile (599.7/km2). There were 505 housing units at an average density of 674.3 per square mile (260.0/km2). The racial makeup of the town was 43.43% White, 53.91% African American, 0.26% Native American, 1.46% from other races, and 0.94% from two or more races. Hispanic or Latino of any race were 2.58% of the population.

There were 474 households, out of which 30.2% had children under the age of 18 living with them, 45.4% were married couples living together, 17.3% had a female householder with no husband present, and 30.6% were non-families. 27.0% of all households were made up of individuals, and 13.1% had someone living alone who was 65 years of age or older. The average household size was 2.45 and the average family size was 3.01.

In the town, the population was spread out, with 24.2% under the age of 18, 8.5% from 18 to 24, 26.1% from 25 to 44, 25.6% from 45 to 64, and 15.6% who were 65 years of age or older. The median age was 41 years. For every 100 females, there were 88.5 males. For every 100 females age 18 and over, there were 84.0 males.

The median income for a household in the town was $27,188, and the median income for a family was $39,861. Males had a median income of $26,500 versus $20,909 for females. The per capita income for the town was $13,533. About 11.0% of families and 14.7% of the population were below the poverty line, including 12.6% of those under age 18 and 23.1% of those age 65 or over.

Education
Elm City includes two public schools, Elm City Elementary (formerly known as Frederick Douglas School), and Elm City Middle School (formerly known as Elm City School/Elm City High School).  It has a good reputation for sports. Jamie Watson, a former NBA athlete, is from Elm City. UNC Basketball alum John Virgil is also from Elm City.

References

External links
 Official website

Towns in North Carolina
Towns in Wilson County, North Carolina